Bad Schussenried station is a railway station in the municipality of Bad Schussenried, located in the Biberach district in Baden-Württemberg, Germany.

References

Railway stations in Baden-Württemberg
Buildings and structures in Biberach (district)